Jacqueline Mazarella (born June 11, 1968, in New Jersey) is an American actress. She is best known for her role as an unsympathetic Ms. Morello in the UPN/CW sitcom Everybody Hates Chris.

Filmography

References

External links

Living people
21st-century American actresses
American television actresses
American people of Italian descent
1968 births
Actresses from New Jersey